Kievan Rus', also known as Kyivan Rus&apos; (or), was a state and later an amalgam of principalities in Eastern and Northern Europe from the late 9th to the mid-13th century. Encompassing a variety of polities and peoples, including East Slavic, Norse, and Finnic, it was ruled by the Rurik dynasty, founded by the Varangian prince Rurik. The modern nations of Belarus, Russia, and Ukraine all claim Kievan Rus' as their cultural ancestor, with Belarus and Russia deriving their names from it. At its greatest extent in the mid-11th century, Kievan Rus' stretched from the White Sea in the north to the Black Sea in the south and from the headwaters of the Vistula in the west to the Taman Peninsula in the east, uniting the East Slavic tribes.

According to the Primary Chronicle, the first ruler to start uniting East Slavic lands into what would become Kievan Rus' was Prince Oleg. He extended his control from Novgorod south along the Dnieper river valley to protect trade from Khazar incursions from the east, and took control of the city of Kiev (Kyiv). Sviatoslav I achieved the first major territorial expansion of the state, fighting a war of conquest against the Khazars. Vladimir the Great spread Christianity with his own baptism and, by decree, extended it to all inhabitants of Kiev and beyond. Kievan Rus' reached its greatest extent under Yaroslav the Wise; his sons assembled and issued its first written legal code, the Russkaya Pravda, shortly after his death.

The state began to decline in the late 11th century, gradually disintegrating into various rival regional powers throughout the 12th century. It was further weakened by external factors, such as the decline of the Byzantine Empire, its major economic partner, and the accompanying diminution of trade routes through its territory. It finally fell to the Mongol invasion in the mid-13th century, though the Rurik dynasty would continue to rule until the death of Feodor I of Russia in 1598.

Names 

Various etymologies have been proposed, including , the Finnish designation for Sweden or Ros, a tribe from the middle Dnieper valley region.

According to the prevalent theory, the name Rus&apos;, like the Proto-Finnic name for Sweden (*rootsi), is derived from an Old Norse term for 'men who row' (rods-) because rowing was the main method of navigating the rivers of Eastern Europe, and could be linked to the Swedish coastal area of Roslagen (Rus-law) or Roden, as it was known in earlier times. The name Rus&apos; would then have the same origin as the Finnish and Estonian names for Sweden: Ruotsi and Rootsi.

When the Varangian princes arrived, the name Rus' was associated with them, and the territories they controlled were called Rus' land: initially the cities of Kyiv, Chernihiv, and Pereiaslav and their surroundings. From the late tenth century, Vladimir the Great and Yaroslav the Wise tried to associate the name with all of the extended princely domains, but in the specific sense it continued to refer to this triangular territory east of the middle Dnieper until after the disintegration of Kievan Rus'.

The term Kievan Rus&apos; was coined in the 19th century in Russian historiography to refer to the period when the centre was in Kiev. In English, the term was introduced in the early 20th century, when it was found in the 1913 English translation of Vasily Klyuchevsky's A History of Russia, to distinguish the early polity from successor states, which were also named Rus&apos;. The variant Kyivan Rus&apos; appeared in English-language scholarship by the 1950s.

The historically accurate but rare spelling Kyevan Rus&apos;, based on Old East Slavic  'Kyiv', is also occasionally seen.

The Varangian Rus' from Scandinavia used the Old Norse name , "land of cities", because fortified settlements were so numerous in Kievan Rus'.

History

Origin
Prior to the emergence of Kievan Rus' in the 9th century, most of the area north of the Black Sea, which roughly overlaps with modern-day Ukraine and Belarus, was primarily populated by eastern Slavic tribes. In the northern region around Novgorod were the Ilmen Slavs and neighboring Krivichi, who occupied territories surrounding the headwaters of the West Dvina, Dnieper and Volga rivers. To their north, in the Ladoga and Karelia regions, were the Finnic Chud tribe. In the south, in the area around Kiev, were the Poliane, a group of Slavicized tribes with Iranian origins, the Drevliane to the west of the Dnieper, and the Severiane to the east. To their north and east were the Vyatichi, and to their south was forested land settled by Slav farmers, giving way to steppelands populated by nomadic herdsmen.

There was once controversy over whether the Rus' were Varangians or Slavs, however, more recently scholarly attention has focused more on debating how quickly an ancestrally Norse people assimilated into Slavic culture. This uncertainty is due largely to a paucity of contemporary sources. Attempts to address this question instead rely on archaeological evidence, the accounts of foreign observers, and legends and literature from centuries later. To some extent the controversy is related to the foundation myths of modern states in the region. This often unfruitful debate over origins has periodically devolved into competing nationalist narratives of dubious scholarly value being promoted directly by various government bodies, in a number of states. This was seen in the Stalinist period, when Soviet historiography sought to distance the Rus' from any connection to Germanic tribes, in an effort to dispel Nazi propaganda claiming the Russian state owed its existence and origins to the supposedly racially superior Norse tribes. More recently, in the context of resurgent nationalism in post-Soviet states, Anglophone scholarship has analyzed renewed efforts to use this debate to create ethno-nationalist foundation stories, with governments sometimes directly involved in the project. Conferences and publications questioning the Norse origins of the Rus' have been supported directly by state policy in some cases, and the resultant foundation myths have been included in some school textbooks in Russia.

While Varangians were Norse traders and Vikings, some Russian and Ukrainian nationalist historians argue that the Rus' were themselves Slavs (see Anti-Normanism). Normanist theories focus on the earliest written source for the East Slavs, the Primary Chronicle, which was produced in the 12th century. Nationalist accounts on the other hand have suggested that the Rus' were present before the arrival of the Varangians, noting that only a handful of Scandinavian words can be found in Russian and that Scandinavian names in the early chronicles were soon replaced by Slavic names.

Nevertheless, the close connection between the Rus' and the Norse is confirmed both by extensive Scandinavian settlement in Belarus, Russia, and Ukraine and by Slavic influences in the Swedish language. Though the debate over the origin of the Rus' remains politically charged, there is broad agreement that if the proto-Rus' were indeed originally Norse, they were quickly nativized, adopting Slavic languages and other cultural practices. This position, roughly representing a scholarly consensus (at least outside of nationalist historiography), was summarized by the historian, F. Donald Logan, "in 839, the Rus were Swedes; in 1043 the Rus were Slavs". Recent scholarship has attempted to move past the narrow and politicized debate on origins, to focus on how and why assimilation took place so quickly. Some modern DNA testing also points to Viking origins, not only of some of the early Rus' princely family and/or their retinues, but also links to possible brethren from neighboring countries like Sviatopolk I of Kiev.

Ahmad ibn Fadlan, an Arab traveler during the 10th century, provided one of the earliest written descriptions of the Rus': "They are as tall as a date palm, blond and ruddy, so that they do not need to wear a tunic nor a cloak; rather the men among them wear garments that only cover half of his body and leaves one of his hands free." Liutprand of Cremona, who was twice an envoy to the Byzantine court (949 and 968), identifies the "Russi" with the Norse ("the Russi, whom we call Norsemen by another name") but explains the name as a Greek term referring to their physical traits ("A certain people made up of a part of the Norse, whom the Greeks call [...] the Russi on account of their physical features, we designate as Norsemen because of the location of their origin."). Leo the Deacon, a 10th-century Byzantine historian and chronicler, refers to the Rus' as "Scythians" and notes that they tended to adopt Greek rituals and customs. But 'Scythians' in Greek parlance is used predominantly as a generic term for nomads.

Invitation of the Varangians

According to the Primary Chronicle, the territories of the East Slavs in the 9th century were divided between the Varangians and the Khazars. The Varangians are first mentioned imposing tribute from Slavic and Finnic tribes in 859. In 862, the Finnic and Slavic tribes in the area of Novgorod rebelled against the Varangians, driving them "back beyond the sea and, refusing them further tribute, set out to govern themselves." The tribes had no laws, however, and soon began to make war with one another, prompting them to invite the Varangians back to rule them and bring peace to the region:

Modern scholars find this an unlikely series of events, probably made up by the 12th-century Orthodox priests who authored the Chronicle as an explanation how the Vikings managed to conquer the lands along the Varangian route so easily, as well as to support the legitimacy of the Rurikid dynasty. The three brothers—Rurik, Sineus and Truvor—supposedly established themselves in Novgorod, Beloozero and Izborsk, respectively. Two of the brothers died, and Rurik became the sole ruler of the territory and progenitor of the Rurik dynasty. A short time later, two of Rurik's men, Askold and Dir, asked him for permission to go to Tsargrad (Constantinople). On their way south, they discovered "a small city on a hill," Kiev, captured it and the surrounding country from the Khazars, populated the region with more Varangians, and "established their dominion over the country of the Polyanians."

The Primary Chronicle reports that Askold and Dir continued to Constantinople with a navy to attack the city in 863–66, catching the Byzantines by surprise and ravaging the surrounding area, though other accounts date the attack in 860. Patriarch Photius vividly describes the "universal" devastation of the suburbs and nearby islands, and another account further details the destruction and slaughter of the invasion. The Rus' turned back before attacking the city itself, due either to a storm dispersing their boats, the return of the Emperor, or in a later account, due to a miracle after a ceremonial appeal by the Patriarch and the Emperor to the Virgin. The attack was the first encounter between the Rus' and Byzantines and led the Patriarch to send missionaries north to engage and attempt to convert the Rus' and the Slavs.

Foundation of the Kievan state

Rurik led the Rus' until his death in about 879 or 882, bequeathing his kingdom to his kinsman, Prince Oleg, as regent for his young son, Igor. According to the Primary Chronicle, in 880–82, Oleg led a military force south along the Dnieper river, capturing Smolensk and Lyubech before reaching Kiev, where he deposed and killed Askold and Dir: "Oleg set himself up as prince in Kyiv, and declared that it should be the "mother of Rus' cities." Oleg set about consolidating his power over the surrounding region and the riverways north to Novgorod, imposing tribute on the East Slav tribes.

In 883, he conquered the Drevlians, imposing a fur tribute on them. By 885 he had subjugated the Poliane, Severiane, Vyatichi, and Radimichs, forbidding them to pay further tribute to the Khazars. Oleg continued to develop and expand a network of Rus' forts in Slav lands, begun by Rurik in the north.

The new Kievan state prospered due to its abundant supply of furs, beeswax, honey and slaves for export, and because it controlled three main trade routes of Eastern Europe. In the north, Novgorod served as a commercial link between the Baltic Sea and the Volga trade route to the lands of the Volga Bulgars, the Khazars, and across the Caspian Sea as far as Baghdad, providing access to markets and products from Central Asia and the Middle East. Trade from the Baltic also moved south on a network of rivers and short portages along the Dnieper known as the "route from the Varangians to the Greeks," continuing to the Black Sea and on to Constantinople.

Kiev was a central outpost along the Dnieper route and a hub with the east–west overland trade route between the Khazars and the Germanic lands of Central Europe. and may have been a staging post for Radhanite Jewish traders between Western Europe, Itil and China. These commercial connections enriched Rus' merchants and princes, funding military forces and the construction of churches, palaces, fortifications, and further towns. Demand for luxury goods fostered production of expensive jewelry and religious wares, allowing their export, and an advanced credit and money-lending system may have also been in place.

Early foreign relations

Volatile steppe politics 
The rapid expansion of the Rus' to the south led to conflict and volatile relationships with the Khazars and other neighbors on the Pontic steppe. The Khazars dominated trade from the Volga-Don steppes to the eastern Crimea and the northern Caucasus during the 8th century during an era historians call the 'Pax Khazarica', trading and frequently allying with the Byzantine Empire against Persians and Arabs. In the late 8th century, the collapse of the Göktürk Khaganate led the Magyars and the Pechenegs, Ugrians and Turkic peoples from Central Asia, to migrate west into the steppe region, leading to military conflict, disruption of trade, and instability within the Khazar Khaganate. The Rus' and Slavs had earlier allied with the Khazars against Arab raids on the Caucasus, but they increasingly worked against them to secure control of the trade routes.

The Byzantine Empire was able to take advantage of the turmoil to expand its political influence and commercial relationships, first with the Khazars and later with the Rus' and other steppe groups. The Byzantines established the Theme of Cherson, formally known as Klimata, in the Crimea in the 830s to defend against raids by the Rus' and to protect vital grain shipments supplying Constantinople. Cherson also served as a key diplomatic link with the Khazars and others on the steppe, and it became the centre of Black Sea commerce. The Byzantines also helped the Khazars build a fortress at Sarkel on the Don river to protect their northwest frontier against incursions by the Turkic migrants and the Rus', and to control caravan trade routes and the portage between the Don and Volga rivers.

The expansion of the Rus' put further military and economic pressure on the Khazars, depriving them of territory, tributaries and trade. In around 890, Oleg waged an indecisive war in the lands of the lower Dniester and Dnieper rivers with the Tivertsi and the Ulichs, who were likely acting as vassals of the Magyars, blocking Rus' access to the Black Sea. In 894, the Magyars and Pechenegs were drawn into the wars between the Byzantines and the Bulgarian Empire. The Byzantines arranged for the Magyars to attack Bulgarian territory from the north, and Bulgaria in turn persuaded the Pechenegs to attack the Magyars from their rear.

Boxed in, the Magyars were forced to migrate further west across the Carpathian Mountains into the Hungarian plain, depriving the Khazars of an important ally and a buffer from the Rus'. The migration of the Magyars allowed Rus' access to the Black Sea, and they soon launched excursions into Khazar territory along the sea coast, up the Don river, and into the lower Volga region. The Rus' were raiding and plundering into the Caspian Sea region from 864, with the first large-scale expedition in 913, when they extensively raided Baku, Gilan, Mazandaran and penetrated into the Caucasus.

As the 10th century progressed, the Khazars were no longer able to command tribute from the Volga Bulgars, and their relationship with the Byzantines deteriorated, as Byzantium increasingly allied with the Pechenegs against them. The Pechenegs were thus secure to raid the lands of the Khazars from their base between the Volga and Don rivers, allowing them to expand to the west. Rus' relations with the Pechenegs were complex, as the groups alternately formed alliances with and against one another. The Pechenegs were nomads roaming the steppe raising livestock which they traded with the Rus' for agricultural goods and other products.

The lucrative Rus' trade with the Byzantine Empire had to pass through Pecheneg-controlled territory, so the need for generally peaceful relations was essential. Nevertheless, while the Primary Chronicle reports the Pechenegs entering Rus' territory in 915 and then making peace, they were waging war with one another again in 920. Pechenegs are reported assisting the Rus' in later campaigns against the Byzantines, yet allied with the Byzantines against the Rus' at other times.

Rus'–Byzantine relations

After the Rus' attack on Constantinople in 860, the Byzantine Patriarch Photius sent missionaries north to convert the Rus' and the Slavs to Christianity. Prince Rastislav of Moravia had requested the Emperor to provide teachers to interpret the holy scriptures, so in 863 the brothers Cyril and Methodius were sent as missionaries, due to their knowledge of the Slavonic language. The Slavs had no written language, so the brothers devised the Glagolitic alphabet, later replaced by Cyrillic (developed in the First Bulgarian Empire) and standardized the language of the Slavs, later known as Old Church Slavonic. They translated portions of the Bible and drafted the first Slavic civil code and other documents, and the language and texts spread throughout Slavic territories, including Kievan Rus'. The mission of Cyril and Methodius served both evangelical and diplomatic purposes, spreading Byzantine cultural influence in support of imperial foreign policy. In 867 the Patriarch announced that the Rus' had accepted a bishop, and in 874 he speaks of an "Archbishop of the Rus'."

Relations between the Rus' and Byzantines became more complex after Oleg took control over Kiev, reflecting commercial, cultural, and military concerns. The wealth and income of the Rus' depended heavily upon trade with Byzantium. Constantine Porphyrogenitus described the annual course of the princes of Kiev, collecting tribute from client tribes, assembling the product into a flotilla of hundreds of boats, conducting them down the Dnieper to the Black Sea, and sailing to the estuary of the Dniester, the Danube delta, and on to Constantinople. On their return trip they would carry silk fabrics, spices, wine, and fruit.

The importance of this trade relationship led to military action when disputes arose. The Primary Chronicle reports that the Rus' attacked Constantinople again in 907, probably to secure trade access. The Chronicle glorifies the military prowess and shrewdness of Oleg, an account imbued with legendary detail. Byzantine sources do not mention the attack, but a pair of treaties in 907 and 911 set forth a trade agreement with the Rus', the terms suggesting pressure on the Byzantines, who granted the Rus' quarters and supplies for their merchants and tax-free trading privileges in Constantinople.

The Chronicle provides a mythic tale of Oleg's death. A sorcerer prophesies that the death of the prince would be associated with a certain horse. Oleg has the horse sequestered, and it later dies. Oleg goes to visit the horse and stands over the carcass, gloating that he had outlived the threat, when a snake strikes him from among the bones, and he soon becomes ill and dies. The Chronicle reports that Prince Igor succeeded Oleg in 913, and after some brief conflicts with the Drevlians and the Pechenegs, a period of peace ensued for over twenty years.

In 941, Igor led another major Rus' attack on Constantinople, probably over trading rights again. A navy of 10,000 vessels, including Pecheneg allies, landed on the Bithynian coast and devastated the Asiatic shore of the Bosphorus. The attack was well timed, perhaps due to intelligence, as the Byzantine fleet was occupied with the Arabs in the Mediterranean, and the bulk of its army was stationed in the east. The Rus' burned towns, churches and monasteries, butchering the people and amassing booty. The emperor arranged for a small group of retired ships to be outfitted with Greek fire throwers and sent them out to meet the Rus', luring them into surrounding the contingent before unleashing the Greek fire.

Liutprand of Cremona wrote that "the Rus', seeing the flames, jumped overboard, preferring water to fire. Some sank, weighed down by the weight of their breastplates and helmets; others caught fire." Those captured were beheaded. The ploy dispelled the Rus' fleet, but their attacks continued into the hinterland as far as Nicomedia, with many atrocities reported as victims were crucified and set up for use as targets. At last a Byzantine army arrived from the Balkans to drive the Rus' back, and a naval contingent reportedly destroyed much of the Rus' fleet on its return voyage (possibly an exaggeration since the Rus' soon mounted another attack). The outcome indicates increased military might by Byzantium since 911, suggesting a shift in the balance of power.

Igor returned to Kiev keen for revenge. He assembled a large force of warriors from among neighboring Slavs and Pecheneg allies, and sent for reinforcements of Varangians from "beyond the sea." In 944 the Rus' force advanced again on the Greeks, by land and sea, and a Byzantine force from Cherson responded. The Emperor sent gifts and offered tribute in lieu of war, and the Rus' accepted. Envoys were sent between the Rus', the Byzantines, and the Bulgarians in 945, and a peace treaty was completed. The agreement again focused on trade, but this time with terms less favorable to the Rus', including stringent regulations on the conduct of Rus' merchants in Cherson and Constantinople and specific punishments for violations of the law. The Byzantines may have been motivated to enter the treaty out of concern of a prolonged alliance of the Rus', Pechenegs, and Bulgarians against them, though the more favorable terms further suggest a shift in power.

Sviatoslav

Following the death of Igor in 945, his wife Olga ruled as regent in Kiev until their son Sviatoslav reached maturity (c. 963). His decade-long reign over Rus' was marked by rapid expansion through the conquest of the Khazars of the Pontic steppe and the invasion of the Balkans. By the end of his short life, Sviatoslav carved out for himself the largest state in Europe, eventually moving his capital from Kiev to Pereyaslavets on the Danube in 969.

In contrast with his mother's conversion to Christianity, Sviatoslav, like his druzhina, remained a staunch pagan. Due to his abrupt death in an ambush in 972, Sviatoslav's conquests, for the most part, were not consolidated into a functioning empire, while his failure to establish a stable succession led to a fratricidal feud among his sons, which resulted in two of his three sons being killed.

Reign of Vladimir and Christianisation

It is not clearly documented when the title of the Grand Duke was first introduced, but the importance of the Kiev principality was recognized after the death of Sviatoslav I in 972 and the ensuing struggle between Vladimir/Volodymyr the Great and Yaropolk I. The region of Kiev dominated the state of Kievan Rus' for the next two centuries. The zenith of the state's power came during the reigns of Vladimir the Great and Prince Yaroslav I the Wise. Both rulers continued the steady expansion of Kievan Rus' that had begun under Oleg.

Vladimir had been prince of Novgorod when his father Sviatoslav I died in 972. He was forced to flee to Scandinavia in 976 after his half-brother Yaropolk had murdered his other brother Oleg and taken control of Rus. In Scandinavia, with the help of his relative Earl Håkon Sigurdsson, ruler of Norway, Vladimir assembled a Viking army and reconquered Novgorod and Kiev from Yaropolk.

Although sometimes solely attributed to Vladimir/Volodymyr, the Christianization of Kievan Rus' was a long and complicated process that began before the state's formation. As early as the 1st century CE, Greeks in the Black Sea Colonies converted to Christianity, and the Primary Chronicle even records the legend of Andrew the Apostle's mission to these coastal settlements, as well as blessing the site of present-day Kyiv. The Goths migrated to through the region in the 3rd century, adopting Arian Christianity in the 4th century, leaving behind 4th- and 5th-century churches excavated in Crimea, although the Hunnic invasion of the 370s halted Christianisation for several centuries. Some of the earliest Kyivan princes and princesses such as Askold and Dir and Olha of Kyiv reportedly converted to Christianity, but Oleh the Wise, Ihor of Kyiv and Svyatoslav remained pagans.

The Primary Chronicle records the legend that when Vladimir/Volodymyr had decided to accept a new faith instead of traditional Slavic paganism, he sent out some of his most valued advisors and warriors as emissaries to different parts of Europe. They visited the Christians of the Latin Church, the Jews, and the Muslims before finally arriving in Constantinople. They rejected Islam because, among other things, it prohibited the consumption of alcohol, and Judaism because the god of the Jews had permitted his chosen people to be deprived of their country. They found the ceremonies in the Roman church to be dull. But at Constantinople, they were so astounded by the beauty of the cathedral of Hagia Sophia and the liturgical service held there that they made up their minds there and then about the faith they would like to follow. Upon their arrival home, they convinced Vladimir that the faith of the Byzantine Rite was the best choice of all, upon which Vladimir made a journey to Constantinople and arranged to marry Princess Anna, the sister of Byzantine emperor Basil II. Historically, it is more likely that he adopted Byzantine Christianity in order to strengthen his diplomatic relations with Constantinople. Vladimir's choice of Eastern Christianity may have reflected his close personal ties with Constantinople, which dominated the Black Sea and hence trade on Kiev's most vital commercial route, the Dnieper River. According to the Primary Chronicle, Volodymyr was baptised in  987, and ordered the population of Kyiv to be baptised in August 988. The greatest resistance against Christianisation appears to have occurred in northern towns including Novgorod, Suzdal, and Belozersk.

Adherence to the Eastern Church had long-range political, cultural, and religious consequences. The church had a liturgy written in Cyrillic and a corpus of translations from Greek that had been produced for the Slavic peoples. This literature facilitated the conversion to Christianity of the Eastern Slavs and introduced them to rudimentary Greek philosophy, science, and historiography without the necessity of learning Greek (there were some merchants who did business with Greeks and likely had an understanding of contemporary business Greek). In contrast, educated people in medieval Western and Central Europe learned Latin. Enjoying independence from the Roman authority and free from tenets of Latin learning, the East Slavs developed their own literature and fine arts, quite distinct from those of other Eastern Orthodox countries. (See Old East Slavic language and Architecture of Kievan Rus for details). Following the Great Schism of 1054, the Rus' church maintained communion with both Rome and Constantinople for some time, but along with most of the Eastern churches it eventually split to follow the Eastern Orthodox. That being said, unlike other parts of the Greek world, Kievan Rus' did not have a strong hostility to the Western world.

Golden age

Yaroslav, known as "the Wise", struggled for power with his brothers. A son of Vladimir the Great, he was prince of Novgorod at the time of his father's death in 1015. Subsequently, his eldest surviving brother, Svyatopolk the Accursed, according to domestic but not foreign sources, killed three of his other brothers and seized power in Kiev. Yaroslav, with the active support of the Novgorodians and the help of Viking mercenaries, defeated Svyatopolk and became the grand prince of Kiev in 1019.

Although he first established his rule over Kiev in 1019, he did not have uncontested rule of all of Kievan Rus' until 1036. Like Vladimir, Yaroslav was eager to improve relations with the rest of Europe, especially the Byzantine Empire. Yaroslav's granddaughter, Eupraxia, the daughter of his son Vsevolod I, Prince of Kiev, was married to Henry IV, Holy Roman Emperor. Yaroslav also arranged marriages for his sister and three daughters to the kings of Poland, France, Hungary and Norway.

Yaroslav promulgated the first East Slavic law code, Russkaya Pravda; built Saint Sophia Cathedral in Kiev and Saint Sophia Cathedral in Novgorod; patronized local clergy and monasticism; and is said to have founded a school system. Yaroslav's sons developed the great Kiev Pechersk Lavra (monastery), which functioned in Kievan Rus' as an ecclesiastical academy.

Succession issues 

In the centuries that followed the state's foundation, Rurik's descendants shared power over Kievan Rus'. The means by which royal power was transferred from one Rurikid ruler to the next is unclear, however, with Magocsi (2010) saying: 'Scholars have debated what the actual system of succession was or whether there was any system at all.' According to Kollmann (1990), the rota system was used with the princely succession moving from elder to younger brother and from uncle to nephew, as well as from father to son. Junior members of the dynasty usually began their official careers as rulers of a minor district, progressed to more lucrative principalities, and then competed for the coveted throne of Kiev. Whatever the case, according to Katchanovski et al. (2013), 'no adequate system of succession to the Kyivan throne was developed' after the death of Yaroslav the Wise, commencing a process of gradual disintegration.

The unconventional power succession system fomented constant hatred and rivalry within the royal family. Familicide was frequently deployed to obtain power and can be traced particularly during the time of the Yaroslavichi (sons of Yaroslav), when the established system was skipped in the establishment of Vladimir II Monomakh as the Grand Prince of Kiev, in turn creating major squabbles between Olegovichi from Chernigov, Monomakhs from Pereyaslav, Izyaslavichi from Turov/Volhynia, and Polotsk Princes. The position of the Grand Prince of Kiev was weakened by the growing influence of regional clans.

Fragmentation and decline

The rival Principality of Polotsk was contesting the power of the Grand Prince by occupying Novgorod, while Rostislav Vladimirovich was fighting for the Black Sea port of Tmutarakan belonging to Chernigov. Three of Yaroslav's sons that first allied together found themselves fighting each other especially after their defeat to the Cuman forces in 1068 at the Battle of the Alta River. At the same time, an uprising took place in Kiev, bringing to power Vseslav of Polotsk who supported the traditional Slavic paganism.

The ruling Grand Prince Iziaslav fled to Poland asking for support and in a couple of years returned to establish the order. The affairs became even more complicated by the end of the 11th century driving the state into chaos and constant warfare. On the initiative of Vladimir II Monomakh in 1097 the first federal council of Kievan Rus' took place near Chernigov in the city of Liubech with the main intention to find an understanding among the fighting sides. However, even though that did not really stop the fighting, it certainly cooled things off.

By 1130, all descendants of Vseslav the Seer had been exiled to the Byzantine Empire by Mstislav the Great. The most fierce resistance to the Monomakhs was posed by the Olegovichi when the izgoi Vsevolod II managed to become the Grand Prince of Kiev. The Rostislavichi who had initially established in Halych lands by 1189 were defeated by the Monomakh-Piast descendant Roman the Great.

The decline of Constantinople—a main trading partner of Kievan Rus'—played a significant role in the decline of the Kievan Rus'. The trade route from the Varangians to the Greeks, along which the goods were moving from the Black Sea (mainly Byzantine) through eastern Europe to the Baltic, was a cornerstone of Kievan wealth and prosperity. These trading routes became less important as the Byzantine Empire declined in power and Western Europe created new trade routes to Asia and the Near East. As people relied less on passing through Kievan Rus' territories for trade, the Kievan Rus' economy suffered.

The last ruler to maintain a united state was Mstislav the Great. After his death in 1132, the Kievan Rus' fell into recession and a rapid decline, and Mstislav's successor Yaropolk II of Kiev, instead of focusing on the external threat of the Cumans, was embroiled in conflicts with the growing power of the Novgorod Republic. In March 1169, a coalition of native princes led by Andrei Bogolyubsky of Vladimir sacked Kiev. This changed the perception of Kiev and was evidence of the fragmentation of the Kievan Rus'. By the end of the 12th century, the Kievan state fragmented even further, into roughly twelve different principalities.

The Crusades brought a shift in European trade routes that accelerated the decline of Kievan Rus'. In 1204, the forces of the Fourth Crusade sacked Constantinople, making the Dnieper trade route marginal. At the same time, the Livonian Brothers of the Sword (of the Northern Crusades) were conquering the Baltic region and threatening the Lands of Novgorod. Concurrently with it, the Ruthenian Federation of Kievan Rus' started to disintegrate into smaller principalities as the Rurik dynasty grew. The local Orthodox Christianity of Kievan Rus', while struggling to establish itself in the predominantly pagan state and losing its main base in Constantinople, was on the brink of extinction. Some of the main regional centres that developed later were Novgorod, Chernigov, Halych, Kiev, Ryazan, Vladimir-upon-Klyazma, Volodimer-Volyn and Polotsk.

Novgorod Republic

In the north, the Republic of Novgorod prospered because it controlled trade routes from the River Volga to the Baltic Sea. As Kievan Rus' declined, Novgorod became more independent. A local oligarchy ruled Novgorod; major government decisions were made by a town assembly, which also elected a prince as the city's military leader. In 1136, Novgorod revolted against Kiev, and became independent.

Now an independent city republic, and referred to as "Lord Novgorod the Great" it would spread its "mercantile interest" to the west and the north; to the Baltic Sea and the low-populated forest regions, respectively. In 1169, Novgorod acquired its own archbishop, named Ilya, a sign of further increased importance and political independence. Novgorod enjoyed a wide degree of autonomy although being closely associated with the Kievan Rus.

Novgorod avoided the Mongol invasion by agreeing to pay tribute to the Golden Horde, and was eventually conquered by Ivan III in 1478 .

Northeast

In the northeast, Slavs from the Kievan region colonized the territory that later would become the Grand Duchy of Moscow by subjugating and merging with the Finnic tribes already occupying the area. The city of Rostov, the oldest centre of the northeast, was supplanted first by Suzdal and then by the city of Vladimir, which become the capital of Vladimir-Suzdal. The combined principality of Vladimir-Suzdal asserted itself as a major power in Kievan Rus' in the late 12th century.

In 1169, Prince Andrey Bogolyubskiy of Vladimir-Suzdal sacked the city of Kiev and took over the title of the grand prince to claim primacy in Rus'. Prince Andrey then installed his younger brother, who ruled briefly in Kiev while Andrey continued to rule his realm from Suzdal. In 1299, in the wake of the Mongol invasion, the metropolitan moved from Kiev to the city of Vladimir and Vladimir-Suzdal.

Southwest

To the southwest, the Principality of Halych had developed trade relations with its Polish, Hungarian and Lithuanian neighbours and emerged as the local successor to Kievan Rus'. In 1199, Prince Roman Mstislavych united the two previously separate principalities of Halych and Volhynia. In 1202 he conquered Kiev, and assumed the title of Knyaz of Kievan Rus', which was held by the rulers of Vladimir-Suzdal since 1169.

His son Danylo looked for support from the West. He accepted a crown as a "Rex Rusiae" ("King of Rus") from the Roman papacy, apparently doing so without breaking with Constantinople. In 1370, the patriarch of the Eastern Orthodox Church in Constantinople granted the King of Poland a metropolitan for his Ruthenian subjects.

Lithuanian rulers also requested and received a metropolitan for Novagrudok shortly afterwards. Cyprian, a candidate pushed by the Lithuanian rulers, became Metropolitan of Kiev in 1375 and metropolitan of Moscow in 1382; this way the church in the territory of former Kievan Rus' was reunited for some time. In 1439, Kiev became the seat of a separate "Metropolitan of Kiev, Halych and all Rus'" for all Greek Orthodox Christians under Polish-Lithuanian rule.

However, a long and unsuccessful struggle against the Mongols combined with internal opposition to the prince and foreign intervention weakened Galicia-Volhynia. With the end of the Mstislavich branch of the Rurikids in the mid-14th century, Galicia-Volhynia ceased to exist; Poland conquered Halych; Lithuania took Volhynia, including Kiev, conquered by Gediminas in 1321 ending the rule of Rurikids in the city. Lithuanian rulers then assumed the title over Ruthenia.

Final disintegration

Following the Mongol invasion of Cumania (or the Kipchaks), in which case many Cuman rulers fled to Rus', such as Köten, the state finally disintegrated under the pressure of the Mongol invasion of Rus', fragmenting it into successor principalities who paid tribute to the Golden Horde (the so-called Tatar Yoke). Just prior to the Mongol invasion, Kievan Rus had been a relatively prosperous region. International trade as well as skilled artisans flourished, while its farms produced enough to feed the urban population. After the invasion of the late 1230s, the economy shattered, and its population were either slaughtered or sold into slavery; while skilled laborers and artisans were sent to the Mongol's steppe regions.

In the late 15th century, the Muscovite Grand Dukes began taking over former Kievan territories and proclaimed themselves the sole legal successors of the Kievan principality according to the protocols of the medieval theory of translatio imperii.

Of the Rus' principalities, only Polatsk escaped the Mongol invasions of 1237–39, but Lithuania made it a vassal in 1240, annexed it in 1307, although it retained local autonomy into the 1390s.

On the southwestern periphery, Kievan Rus' was succeeded by the Principality of Galicia-Volhynia. Later, as these territories, now part of modern central Ukraine and Belarus, fell to the Gediminids, the powerful, largely Ruthenized Grand Duchy of Lithuania drew heavily on Rus' cultural and legal traditions. From 1398 until the Union of Lublin in 1569 its full name was the Grand Duchy of Lithuania, Ruthenia and Samogitia. After the Union of Lublin, the southern parts of the Grand Duchy were joined to the remnants of Galicia-Volhynia, forming a split of Ruthenia in the Lesser Poland Province, Crown of the Kingdom of Poland. This would almost be the modern borders between northern and southern Ruthenia, or modern Ukraine and Belarus, which have historically been influenced by Poland and Lithuania respectively.

On the north-eastern periphery of Kievan Rus', traditions were adapted in the Vladimir-Suzdal Principality that gradually gravitated towards Moscow. To the very north, the Novgorod and Pskov Feudal Republics were less autocratic than Vladimir-Suzdal-Moscow until they were absorbed by the Grand Duchy of Moscow. Modern historians from Belarus, Russia and Ukraine alike consider Kievan Rus' the first period of their modern countries' histories.

Economy

In the early 10th century, Kievan Rus' mainly traded with other tribes in Eastern Europe and Scandinavia. "There was little need for complex social structures to carry out these exchanges in the forests north of the steppes. So long as the entrepreneurs operated in small numbers and kept to the north, they did not catch the attention of observers or writers." The Rus' also had strong trading ties to Byzantium, particularly in the early 900s, as treaties in 911 and 944 indicate. These treaties deal with the treatment of runaway Byzantine slaves and limitations on the amounts of certain commodities such as silk that could be bought from Byzantium. The Rus' used log rafts floated down the Dnieper River by Slavic tribes for the transport of goods, particularly slaves to Byzantium.

During the Kievan era, trade and transport depended largely on networks of rivers and portages. By this period, trade networks had expanded to cater to more than just local demand. This is evidenced by a survey of glassware found in over 30 sites ranging from Suzdal, Drutsk and Belozeroo, which found that a substantial majority was manufactured in Kiev. Kiev was the main depot and transit point for trade between itself, Byzantium and the Black Sea region. Even though this trade network had already been existent, the volume of which had expanded rapidly in the 11th century. Kiev was also dominant in internal trade between the Rus towns; it held a monopoly on glassware products (glass vessels, glazed pottery and window glass) up until the early- to mid-12th century until which it lost its monopoly to the other Rus towns. Inlaid enamel production techniques was borrowed from Byzantine. Byzantine amphorae, wine and olive oil have been found along the middle Dnieper, suggesting trade between Kiev, along trade towns to Byzantium.

The peoples of Rus' experienced a period of great economic expansion, opening trade routes with the Vikings to the north and west and with the Byzantine Greeks to the south and west; traders also began to travel south and east, eventually making contact with Persia and the peoples of Central Asia.

In winter, the ruler of Kiev went out on rounds, visiting Dregovichs, Krivichs, Drevlians, Severians, and other subordinated tribes. Some paid tribute in money, some in furs or other commodities, and some in slaves. This system was called poliudie.

Society

The lands of Kievan Rus' were mostly made up of forests and steppes (see East European forest steppe and Central European mixed forests), while its main rivers all originated in the Valdai Hills: the Dnieper, and primarily populated by Slavic and Finnic tribes. All tribes were hunter-gatherers to a certain degree, but the Slavs were primarily agriculturalists, growing cereal grains and crops, as well as raising livestock. Before the emergence of the Kievan state, these tribes had their own leaders and gods, and interaction between tribes was occasionally marked either by trading goods or fighting battles. The most valuable commodities traded were captive slaves and fur pelts (usually in exchange for silver coins or oriental finery), and common trade partners were Volga Bolghar, Khazar Itil and Byzantine Chersonesus. By the early 9th century, bands of Scandinavian adventurers known as Varangians and later Rus' started plundering various (Slavic) villages in the region, later extracting tribute in exchange for protection against pillaging by other Varangians. Over time, these relationships of tribute for protection evolved into more permanent political structures: the Rus' lords became princes and the Slavic populace their subjects.

Due to the expansion of trade and its geographical proximity, Kiev became the most important trade centre and chief among the communes; therefore the leader of Kiev gained political "control" over the surrounding areas. This princedom emerged from a coalition of traditional patriarchic family communes banded together in an effort to increase the applicable workforce and expand the productivity of the land. This union developed the first major cities in the Rus' and was the first notable form of self-government. As these communes became larger, the emphasis was taken off the family holdings and placed on the territory that surrounded. This shift in ideology became known as the verv'.

In the 11th and the 12th centuries, the princes and their retinues, which were a mixture of Slavic and Scandinavian elites, dominated the society of Kievan Rus'. Leading soldiers and officials received income and land from the princes in return for their political and military services. Kievan society lacked the class institutions and autonomous towns that were typical of Western European feudalism. Nevertheless, urban merchants, artisans and labourers sometimes exercised political influence through a city assembly, the veche (council), which included all the adult males in the population.

In some cases, the veche either made agreements with their rulers or expelled them and invited others to take their place. At the bottom of society was a stratum of slaves. More important was a class of tribute-paying peasants, who owed labour duty to the princes. The widespread personal serfdom characteristic of Western Europe did not exist in Kievan Rus'.

The change in political structure led to the inevitable development of the peasant class or smerds. The smerdy were free un-landed people that found work by labouring for wages on the manors that began to develop around 1031 as the verv began to dominate socio-political structure. The smerdy were initially given equality in the Kievian law code; they were theoretically equal to the prince; so they enjoyed as much freedom as can be expected of manual labourers. However, in the 13th century, they slowly began to lose their rights and became less equal in the eyes of the law.

 Religion 

According to Martin (2009), 'Christianity, Judaism, and Islam had long been known in these lands, and Olga personally converted to Christianity. When Vladimir assumed the throne, however, he set idols of Norse, Slav, Finn, and Iranian gods, worshipped by the disparate elements of his society, on a hilltop in Kiev in an attempt to create a single pantheon for his people. But for reasons that remain unclear he soon abandoned this attempt in favour of Christianity.'

In 988, the Christian Church in Rus' territorially fell under the jurisdiction of the Ecumenical Patriarchate of Constantinople after it was officially adopted as the state religion. According to several chronicles after that date the predominant cult of Slavic paganism was persecuted.

The exact date of creation of the Kiev Metropolis is uncertain, as well as its first church leader. It is generally considered that the first head was Michael I of Kiev; however, some sources claim it to be Leontiy, who is often placed after Michael or Anastas Chersonesos, who became the first bishop of the Church of the Tithes. The first metropolitan to be confirmed by historical sources is Theopemp, who was appointed by Patriarch Alexius of Constantinople in 1038. Before 1015 there were five dioceses: Kiev, Chernihiv, Bilhorod, Volodymyr, Novgorod, and soon thereafter Yuriy-upon-Ros. The Kiev Metropolitan sent his own delegation to the Council of Bari in 1098.

After the sacking of Kiev in 1169, part of the Kiev metropolis started to move to Vladimir-upon-Klyazma, concluding the move sometime after 1240 when Kiev was taken by Batu Khan. Metropolitan Maxim was the first metropolitan who chose Vladimir-upon-Klyazma as his official residence in 1299. As a result, in 1303, Lev I of Galicia petitioned Patriarch Athanasius I of Constantinople for the creation of a new Halych metropolis; however, it only existed until 1347.

The Church of the Tithes was chosen as the first Cathedral Temple. In 1037, the cathedral was transferred to the newly built Saint Sophia Cathedral in Kiev. Upon the transferring of the metropolitan seat in 1299, the Dormition Cathedral, Vladimir was chosen as the new cathedral.

By the mid-13th century, the dioceses of Kiev Metropolis (988) were as follows: Kiev (988), Pereyaslav, Chernihiv (991), Volodymyr-Volynsky (992), Turov (1005), Polotsk (1104), Novgorod (~990s), Smolensk (1137), Murom (1198), Peremyshl (1120), Halych (1134), Vladimir-upon-Klyazma (1215), Rostov (991), Bilhorod, Yuriy (1032), Chełm (1235) and Tver (1271). There also were dioceses in Zakarpattia and Tmutarakan. In 1261 the Sarai-Batu diocese was established.

Foreign relations

Turkic peoples
From the 9th century, the Pecheneg nomads began an uneasy relationship with Kievan Rus'. For over two centuries they launched sporadic raids into the lands of Rus', which sometimes escalated into full-scale wars (such as the 920 war on the Pechenegs by Igor of Kiev reported in the Primary Chronicle), but there were also temporary military alliances (e.g., the 943 Byzantine campaign by Igor). In 968, the Pechenegs attacked and besieged the city of Kiev. Some speculation exists that the Pechenegs drove off the Tivertsi and the Ulichs to the regions of the upper Dniester river in Bukovina. The Byzantine Empire was known to support the Pechenegs in their military campaigns against the Eastern Slavic states.

Boniak was a Cuman khan who led a series of invasions on Kievan Rus'. In 1096, Boniak attacked Kiev, plundered the Kiev Monastery of the Caves, and burned down the prince's palace in Berestovo. He was defeated in 1107 by Vladimir Monomakh, Oleg, Sviatopolk and other Rus' princes.

Mongols

The Mongol Empire invaded Kievan Rus' in the 13th century, destroying numerous cities, including Ryazan, Kolomna, Moscow, Vladimir and Kiev. Giovanni de Plano Carpini, the Pope's envoy to the Mongol Great Khan, traveled through Kiev in February 1246 and wrote:

When this was done, they [the Mongols, "Tartari")] marched against Rus', and made great havoc in it, destroyed cities and forts, and killed people. They besieged Kyiv, the metropolis of Rus', for a long time, and finally took it and killed its citizens. From there, while passing through that land, we found innumerable skulls and bones of dead men, lying on the ground. For the city had been very large and populous, but now it seems reduced to nothing: for hardly more than two hundred houses remain, whose inhabitants are also held in absolute servitude.Besides the looting and loss of lives, the Mongol invasions led to demands of tribute (vykhod), while expropriations caused villages to be abandoned. The Russians had to provide sustenance and lodgings for Mongol envoys, although tax exemptions were awarded to villages that had to bear the brunt of these costs.

Byzantine Empire

Byzantium quickly became the main trading and cultural partner for Kiev, but relations were not always friendly. One of the largest military accomplishments of the Rurikid dynasty was the attack on Byzantium in 960. Pilgrims of the Rus' had been making the journey from Kiev to Constantinople for many years, and Constantine Porphyrogenitus, the Emperor of the Byzantine Empire, believed that this gave them significant information about the arduous parts of the journey and where travelers were most at risk, as would be pertinent for an invasion. This route took travelers through domain of the Pechenegs, journeying mostly by river. In June 941, the Rus' staged a naval ambush on Byzantine forces, making up for their smaller numbers with small, maneuverable boats. These boats were ill-equipped for the transportation of large quantities of treasure, suggesting that looting was not the goal. The raid was led, according to the Primary Chronicle, by a king called Igor. Three years later, the treaty of 944 stated that all ships approaching Byzantium must be preceded by a letter from the Rurikid prince stating the number of ships and assuring their peaceful intent. This not only indicates fear of another surprise attack, but an increased Kievan presence in the Black Sea.

The most serious conflict between the two powers was the war of 968–971 in Bulgaria, but several Rus' raiding expeditions against the Byzantine cities of the Black Sea coast and Constantinople itself are also recorded. Although most were repulsed, they were concluded by trade treaties that were generally favourable to the Rus'.

Rus'-Byzantine relations became closer following the marriage of the porphyrogenita Anna to Vladimir the Great, and the subsequent Christianization of the Rus': Byzantine priests, architects and artists were invited to work on numerous cathedrals and churches around Rus', expanding Byzantine cultural influence even further. Numerous Rus' served in the Byzantine army as mercenaries, most notably as the famous Varangian Guard.

Military campaigns

 Caspian expeditions of the Rus' (864–1041)
 Rus'–Byzantine Wars (830–1043)
 1018 Polish intervention

Administrative divisions

 Principalities and volosts 

The East Slavic lands were originally divided into princely domains called zemlias, "lands", or volosts (from a term meaning "power" or "government"). A smaller clan-sized unit was called a verv, or pogost, headed by a kopa or viche.

In Kievan Rus' the major administrative division became the principality, or duchy (kniazivstvo), each one the seat of a kniaz (prince or duke).

From the 11th to 13th centuries the principalities were divided into volosts, from its centre usually called a pryhorod (a lesser gorod or grad, "fortified settlement").  A volost consisted of several vervs or hromadas (commune or community). A local official was called a volostel or starosta.

Yaroslav the Wise assigned a priority to the major principalities to reduce familial conflict over succession.

 Kyiv and Novgorod, for the eldest son (Iziaslav in his case), who became grand prince (velykyi kniaz)
 Chernihiv and Tmutorokan (Sviatoslav)
 Pereiaslav and Rostov-Suzdal (Vsevolod)
 Smolensk (Viacheslav)
 Volhynia (Ihor)

Not mentioned by Yaroslav were Polatsk, ruled by Yaroslav's older brother Iziaslav that was to remain under his descendants, and Galicia, eventually taken by the dynasty of his grandson Rostyslav.

Other principalities included Siversk, and smaller territories like the lands of the Polianians (also called Rus'), Drevlian and Turiv-Pynsk (Turaŭ-Pinsk) lands.

 11th century
 Novgorod Land 862–1478 the allied territory of Kievan Rus'; from 1136 the Novgorod Republic
 Rostov Principality until 1125; became Vladimir-Suzdal Principality in 1155
 9th century – 14th century (separatist territory, partial suzerainty under Kievan Rus')
 Principality of Minsk
 from 1054
 Principality of Pereyaslavl
 Principality of Volhynia
 Principality of Kiev from 1132 to 1399
 Principality of Galicia
 Principality of Turov and Pinsk
 Principality of Chernigov
 Murom-Ryazan Principality until 1078
 Principality of Novgorod-Seversk
 City of Tmutarakan from 988 until some time in the 12th century
 Belaya Vezha from 965 until some time in the 12th century
 Southern dependencies''' Oleshky, New Galich, Peresechen'
 Drevlian territories annexed to Rus' by Oleg ?–884; 912–946 (vassal of Rus' from 914, Drevlians Uprising in 945)

 Major cities 

 Belgorod Kievsky, capital of Rus' under Rurik Rostislavich
 Chernigov, capital along with Kiev from 1024 to 1036 (joint rule between Yaroslav and Mstislav)
 Halych
 Kiev
 Minsk, centre of Principality of Minsk
 Murom
 Pereyaslavets, capital of Rus' from 969 to 971 (in present-day Romania)
 Polotsk
 Rostov Veliky
 Ryazan
 Smolensk
 Staraya Ladoga
 Suzdal
 Tmutarakan
 Novgorod
 Vladimir
 Vyshgorod, princes' residence and royal library (at Mezhyhirya)

 Historical assessment 

Kievan Rus', although sparsely populated compared to Western Europe, was not only the largest contemporary European state in terms of area but also culturally advanced. Literacy in Kiev, Novgorod and other large cities was high; as birch bark documents attest, inhabitants exchanged love letters and prepared cheat sheets for schools. Novgorod had a sewage system and wood pavement not often found in other cities at the time. The Russkaya Pravda confined punishments to fines and generally did not use capital punishment. Certain rights were accorded to women, such as property and inheritance rights.

The economic development of Kievan Rus may be reflected in its demographics. Scholarly estimates of Kiev's populationt around 1200 range from 36,000 to 50,000 (at the time, Paris had about 50,000, and London 30,000). Novgorod had about 10,000 to 15,000 inhabitants in 1000, and about double that number by 1200, while Chernigov had a larger land area than both Kiev and Novgorod at the time, and is therefore estimated have had even more inhabitants. Constantinople, then one of the largest cities in the world, had a population of about 400,000 around 1180. Soviet scholar Mikhail Tikhomirov calculated that Kievan Rus' had around 300 urban centres on the eve of the Mongol invasion.

Kievan Rus' also played an important genealogical role in European politics. Yaroslav the Wise, whose stepmother belonged to the Macedonian dynasty that ruled the Byzantine Empire from 867 to 1056, married the only legitimate daughter of the king who Christianized Sweden. His daughters became queens of Hungary, France and Norway; his sons married the daughters of a Polish king and Byzantine emperor, and a niece of the Pope; and his granddaughters were a German empress and (according to one theory) the queen of Scotland. A grandson married the only daughter of the last Anglo-Saxon king of England. Thus the Rurikids were a well-connected royal family of the time.

Serhii Plokhy (2006) proposed to "denationalize" Kievan Rus': contrary to what modern nationalist interpretations had been doing, he argued for 'separating Kyivan Rus' as a multi-ethnic state from the national histories of Russia, Ukraine, and Belarus. This applies to the word Rus' and to the concept of the Rus' Land.' According to Halperin (2010), 'Plokhy's approach does not invalidate analysis of rival claims
by Muscovy, Lithuania or Ukraine to the Kyivan inheritance; it merely relegates such pretensions entirely to the realm of ideology.'

 In popular culture 
 Finnish folk metal band Turisas has produced various songs on its albums The Varangian Way (2007) and Stand Up and Fight (2011) which feature Scandinavian names (Jarisleif in "In the Court of Jarisleif" for Grand Prince Yaroslav) and Old Norse exonyms for toponyms (such as Holmgard in "To Holmgard and Beyond" for Veliky Novgorod, and Miklagard in "Miklagard Overture" for Constantinople) connected to Kievan Rus'. According to Bosselmann (2018) and DiGioia (2020), Scandinavian names are used by Turisas 'as a way to convey the historical context of the songs' subject matter', namely 'the stories of the Scandinavian pre-Christian populations and their travels eastwards along the way known as the Way of the Varangians to the Greek to Constantinople'.

Collection of maps

See also
 De Administrando Imperio – 10th-century Byzantine source written by emperor Constantine VII
 History of Belarus
 History of Russia
 History of Ukraine
 List of Old Norse exonyms – including Scandinavian names for Kievan Rus' toponyms
 Kyivan Rus' Park – park in modern Kyiv
 Rus' chronicle – genre of Old East Slavic literature
 Slavic studies
 Symbols of the Rurikids
 European Russia

 Explanatory notes 

 References 
 Citations 

 Primary sources 
 
 

 Secondary sources 

 
 
 
 
 
  (third edition)
 
  (original). Later editions cited in this article:
  (first published)
  (digital printing 2004)
  (third edition)
 
 
 
 
  – Russia

Further reading

 Christian, David. A History of Russia, Mongolia and Central Asia. Blackwell, 1999.
 Franklin, Simon and Shepard, Jonathon, The Emergence of Rus, 750–1200. (Longman History of Russia, general editor Harold Shukman.) Longman, London, 1996. 
 Fennell, John, The Crisis of Medieval Russia, 1200–1304. (Longman History of Russia, general editor Harold Shukman.) Longman, London, 1983. 
 Jones, Gwyn. A History of the Vikings. 2nd ed. London: Oxford Univ. Press, 1984.
 
 Pritsak, Omeljan. The Origin of Rus". Cambridge Massachusetts: Harvard University Press, 1991.
 Stang, Håkon. The Naming of Russia. Meddelelser, Nr. 77. Oslo: University of Oslo Slavisk-baltisk Avelding, 1996.
 Alexander F. Tsvirkun E-learning course. History of Ukraine. Journal Auditorium, Kyiv, 2010.
 Velychenko, Stephen, National history as cultural process: a survey of the interpretations of Ukraine's past in Polish, Russian, and Ukrainian historical writing from the earliest times to 1914''. Edmonton, 1992.
 Velychenko, Stephen, "Nationalizing and Denationalizing the Past. Ukraine and Russia in Comparative Context", Ab Imperio 1 (2007).
 Velychenko, Stephen "New wine old bottle. Ukrainian history Muscovite-Russian Imperial myths and the Cambridge-History of Russia," Stephen Velychenko. New Wine Old Bottle. Ukrainian History, Muscovite /Russian Imperial Myths and the Cambridge History of Russia

External links

 Historical map of Kiev Rus' from 980. to 1054.
 Historical map of Rus'-Ukraine from 1220. to 1240.
 
 Rus', Encyclopedia of Ukraine
 Ancient Rus: trade and crafts
 Chronology of Kievan Rus' 859–1240.

 
States and territories established in the 870s
States and territories disestablished in 1240
882 establishments
1240 disestablishments in Europe
Former countries in Europe
Medieval Belarus
Medieval Russia
Medieval Ukraine
9th-century establishments in Russia
Historical regions
Former countries